Rainham Hall is a Grade II* listed Georgian house, owned by the National Trust, in Rainham, in the London Borough of Havering. Built in 1729 for Captain John Harle, the house was transferred to the National Trust in 1949; let to a number of private tenants, it remained closed to the public until late 2015. Of note is that Rainham Hall recently appeared as a location in the 2019 BBC production of A Christmas Carol.

Buildings
Rainham Hall is a three-storey brown and red brick house next to the church of St Helen and St Giles in the centre of Rainham in the London Borough of Havering. It is an example of a Dutch domestic Queen Anne style house. Many of the original features of the house remain, including trompe-l'œil frescoes on the walls and Delft tiles in the fireplaces. Outside the front of the house are Grade II* listed wrought-iron railings that feature the intertwining initials of Harle and his wife Mary. They are described as being amongst the finest in London from that time; a guide published by the London Borough of Havering suggests that they might have been created by Jean Tijou, a famed blacksmith who produced the ironwork for Hampton Court Palace.

Along with the main building the grounds contain a stable/coach house and lodge, all of which were given Grade II* listed status in January 1955. Some of the walls in the garden and "stone garden vases of contemporary date" were also listed at the same time. The two-acre garden features a recently replanted 30-tree orchard, one of the largest in London. Harle used the coach house and hall as the main centre for his trading activities. The close proximity of the commercial and domestic buildings is described by the National Trust as "significant because it seems to be a rare survival of a practice which was once widespread".

Rainham Hall has been recommended for an upgrade to Grade I listed status. A 2011 Heritage Scoping Study noted that the main building should be reviewed, stating that "it is one of the finest and best-preserved examples in England of a medium-sized early Georgian merchant’s house" with the National Trust receiving credit for their work on maintaining the property. It goes on to state that the "outstanding level of the significance of this landmark" should merit a review in the listed status.

History

Construction
John Harle was a sea-captain and merchant from South Shields. In 1718 he married Mary Tibbington, a wealthy widow from Stepney, and purchased the Rainham wharf. He invested money dredging the River Ingrebourne, thereby giving trading vessels a route up to Rainham from the Thames. He had Rainham Hall constructed in 1729 using high-quality materials as a showcase for the building products he sold. Harle is credited with being significant in the development of Rainham Village throughout the 18th century. He died in 1742, leaving the house to his second wife.

Decline, sale, and renovation
The Harle family kept possession of the house until 1895, when it fell into a state of disrepair. It was purchased in 1920 by Colonel Herbert Hall Mulliner as a setting for part of his outstanding collections of English furniture and English pottery before being given to the National Trust in 1949.

The buildings have not been fully open to the public for some time, but significant investment is allowing the National Trust to prepare for longer opening hours. Restoration of the buildings is now being funded by the National Trust, Heritage Lottery Fund, and Veolia North Thames Trust and Havering London Borough Council. A grant of £1.5 million was awarded to pay for the redevelopment of the site, including the conservation of the buildings and the introduction of educational and local community schemes. The renovation plan also features a café, bookshop, and exhibition area.

See also
Grade I and II* listed buildings in the London Borough of Havering

References

External links
 
 Rainham Hall - National Trust

Houses in the London Borough of Havering
Historic house museums in London
Museums in the London Borough of Havering
National Trust properties in London
Grade II* listed buildings in the London Borough of Havering
Grade II* listed houses in London
Georgian architecture in London
Country houses in London